David Pigeon led a company of provincial New England militia from the garrison at Annapolis Royal, Nova Scotia up the Annapolis River aboard the whaleboat Devonshire, and was ambushed in the Battle of Bloody Creek on 10 June 1711 (21 June in the New Style). He was a major in Sir Charles Hobbey's Regiment, the North Regiment of Essex. He was taken prisoner, along with the rest of his crew, in Quebec and forced to pay 800 livres for his ransom. He was placed on half-pay in 1713 and continued to draw a pension until at least 1722.

References

People of Queen Anne's War
British military personnel of Queen Anne's War
17th-century births
18th-century deaths
British America army officers